This is a list of notable United States local officials convicted of federal public corruption offenses for conduct while in office. The list is organized by office. Non-notable officials, such as sewer inspectors and zoning commissioners, are not included on this list, although they are routinely prosecuted for the same offenses. Acquitted officials are not listed (if an official was acquitted on some counts, and convicted on others, the counts of conviction are listed). Officials convicted of state crimes are not listed.

For a more complete list see: List of American state and local politicians convicted of crimes.

The criminal statute(s) under which the conviction(s) were obtained are noted, as are the names of notable investigations or scandals, if applicable. If a defendant is convicted of a conspiracy to commit a corruption offense, the substantive offense is listed. Convictions of non-corruption offenses, such as making false statements, perjury, obstruction of justice, electoral fraud, and campaign finance regulations, even if related, are not noted. Nor are derivative convictions, such as tax evasion or money laundering. Officials convicted only of non-corruption offenses are not included on this list, even if indicted on corruption offenses as well. Certain details, including post-conviction relief, if applicable, are included in footnotes.

The Hobbs Act (enacted 1934), the mail and wire fraud statutes (enacted 1872), including the honest services fraud provision, the Travel Act (enacted 1961), the Racketeer Influenced and Corrupt Organizations Act (RICO) (enacted 1970), and the federal program bribery statute, 18 U.S.C. § 666 (enacted 1984), permit the prosecution of such officials. These statutes are also applicable to corrupt federal officials. In addition, federal officials are subject to the federal bribery, graft, and conflict-of-interest crimes contained in Title 18, Chapter 11 of the United States Code, 18 U.S.C. §§ 201–227, which do not apply to state and local officials.

Mayors

City council members

County executives and commissioners

Judges

Other officials

See also
List of federal political scandals in the United States

References

Local officials convicted of federal corruption offenses

Lists of criminals